Tarumá is a small town in Bolivia.

References

Populated places in Santa Cruz Department (Bolivia)